is a Japanese entertainer with Johnny's Entertainment.

Biography
Masuda joined Johnny's Entertainment in November 1998. During his junior days, Masuda backdanced for many of his seniors in the agency, such as KAT-TUN, and participated in many Johnny's junior photoshoots. In 2001, he was cast as a junior high school student in the sixth season of the popular Japanese drama 3-nen B-gumi Kinpachi Sensei. In 2003, he landed the starring role in the drama special Musashi. He also performed with the junior group Kis-My-Ft. as the 'M' after Matsumoto Kohei's departure.

In late 2003, Masuda became a member of the J-pop group NEWS to promote the Women's World Cup of Volleyball Championships. When NEWS went on hiatus in 2006, he and fellow NEWS member Tegoshi Yuya formed the singing group Tegomass. The duo released the single "Miso Soup" in both Sweden and Japan. Masuda was allowed to further his acting experience in 2006 by landing various supporting roles in many Japanese dramas.

In late 2008, Masuda and the promoters of TU→YU formed a singing group to release the song "Soba Ni Iru Yo", which was featured in the product's commercials and released through the Japanese mobile phone network.

Masuda landed a role in the drama Rescue, which aired in January 2009.

In November 2009, Masuda acted in the stage play Ame no Hi no Mori no Naka (Inside a Rainy Day's Forest), with his first stage play leading role.

Masuda starred in the leading role for the drama Rental Nanmoshinai Hito that began airing in April 2020.

In June 2020, the duo Tegomass broke up when Tegoshi left Johnny's Entertainment. Masuda is still active in the group NEWS.

Filmography

Variety shows 
 Ya-Ya-Yah (2003–2007)
 Soukon (2009–2010)
 Ippuku! (2014–2015)
 Mirai Rocket (2014–2015)
 Hen Lab (2015–2016)
 Cho Hamaru! Bakusho Chara Paredo (2016–2017)
 Shounen Club Premium (2016–2019)
 Netapare (2017–present)
 PON (2018)
 Gurunai (2020–present)

Drama 
 Gachi Baka! (2006)
 Dance Drill (2006)
 Rescue (2009)
 Resident 5-nin no Kenshui (2012)
 Voice: 110 Emergency Control Room (2019)
 Pareto No Gosan (2020)
 Rental Nanmoshinai Hito (2020)
 Komi Can't Communicate (2021-2022)

Stage
MachiMasu (2007)
Ame no Hi no Mori no Naka (2009)
Hai iro no Kanaria (2012)
Strange Fruits (2013)
Only You-Bokura No Romeo&Juliet (2018)
How To Succeed Without Really Trying (2020)

Radio
Master Hits (2005–present)
Tegomasu No Radio (2011–2020)
Masumasu Radio (2020–present)

Commercials
 Tu-Yu

References

External links
Johnny's Net
Johnny's Entertainment

Japanese male pop singers
Japanese idols
Japanese baritones
Living people
1986 births
News (band) members
Singers from Tokyo
Baritones
21st-century Japanese singers
21st-century Japanese male actors
21st-century Japanese male singers